Celtica gigantea, commonly called giant feather grass, giant needle grass, or golden oats, is a species of flowering plant in the grass family Poaceae, native to the Iberian Peninsula and Morocco. It is still widely referenced in the horticultural literature under its synonym Stipa gigantea.

Description
Celtica gigantea is a bunchgrass with leaf blades that are narrow and gray-green, creating a bunchgrass foliage mass  in diameter. It is evergreen to semi-evergreen, depending on the climate.

The plant has prominent flower spikes emerging silver-lavender in the late spring, aging to a radiant golden over the summer, and persisting in tan into winter.

Cultivation
Celtica gigantea is grown as an ornamental grass for planting as single specimens and massed drifts in parks, public landscapes, and gardens. It is used in drought tolerant and Mediterranean climate—plant palette gardens.

The tall golden flower spikes are attractive on the plant, especially radiant when backlit by the sun.  They may also be used for dried flowers.

Under the synonym Stipa gigantea this plant and the cultivar 'Gold Fontaene' have won the Royal Horticultural Society's Award of Garden Merit.

See also
Ornamental grasses

References

External links

Pooideae
Bunchgrasses of Europe
Flora of Spain
Garden plants of Europe
Drought-tolerant plants